Arnaldo Mecozzi (1876 in Frascati, Italy - Santos, Brazil 1932) was an Italian decorator and painter. Along with son Vincenzo Mecozzi, he was noted for his work in Brazil. They worked on buildings such as the Igreja do Imaculado Coração de Maria of São Paulo.

References

Italian decorators
19th-century Italian painters
Italian male painters
20th-century Italian painters
1876 births
1932 deaths
People from Frascati
Italian emigrants to Brazil
19th-century Italian male artists
20th-century Italian male artists